Reno Perez (born 1973) is an American singer/songwriter. He recorded three singles while signed to Hacienda Records:  "Tejanita", "Mil Anos", and a Spanish-language version of "Brown Eyed Girl". He is now an independent artist.

His father is Tejano Music Hall of Famer Juan Perez. He has shared the stage with country musician Johnny Rodriguez as musical director/lead guitarist, and toured with others like Flaco Jiménez, Merle Haggard, and Ricky Martin. He has opened for many national acts. Perez is resident composer/artist development with, Austin Music Film and Media studios.

References

External links 
 All Music Site

American country singer-songwriters
People from Corpus Christi, Texas
Singer-songwriters from Texas
Living people
1973 births
American musicians of Mexican descent
21st-century American singers
Country musicians from Texas
Hispanic and Latino American musicians